Logistic may refer to:

Mathematics

 Logistic function, a sigmoid function used in many fields
 Logistic map, a recurrence relation that sometimes exhibits chaos
 Logistic regression, a statistical model using the logistic function
 Logit, the inverse of the logistic function
 Logistic distribution, the derivative of the logistic function, a continuous probability distribution, used in probability theory and statistics
 Mathematical logic, subfield of mathematics exploring the applications of formal logic to mathematics

Other uses
 Logistics, the management of resources and their distributions
 Logistic engineering, the scientific study of logistics
 Military logistics, the study of logistics at the service of military units and operations

See also
Logic (disambiguation)